The 2021 Women's Six Nations Championship was the 20th series of the Women's Six Nations Championship, an annual women's rugby union competition between England, France, Ireland, Italy, Scotland and Wales. The 2021 tournament was given a change of format from its traditional eight week round-robin format to a four-week format consisting of two pools of three teams with a final, inspired by the format of the Autumn Nations Cup, which replaced the 2020 Autumn Internationals. The tournament was held from 3 to 24 April 2021.

As not all teams played each other, the Grand Slam and Triple Crown were not contested.

Background and format
Traditionally, the Women's Six Nations Championship is run concurrently with the men's tournament. However, in January 2021, the 2021 Women's Six Nations Championship was postponed due to the COVID-19 pandemic, which caused travel and time restrictions issues due to qualification of the 2021 Rugby World Cup needing to be completed before the tournament starts in September. Most of the players have jobs outside of rugby, and some players are key workers. This, combined with national lockdowns and the need for COVID-19 testing, made it more difficult to schedule the matches during the pandemic.

On 3 February, it was announced that the 2021 Women's Six Nations Championship would take place between 3 and 25 April, in a condensed format. The six teams were split into two pools of three teams. Each team played the other two teams in their pool, with one match at home and one away. Each team had one bye weekend. The winners of each pool met each other in the final, as did the two second and third-placed teams. The team in Pool A hosted regardless of who performed better in their pool, and the winner of the play-off between the two first-ranked sides won the tournament. The format is similar to the 2020 men's Autumn Nations Cup. Provisional fixture lists were also announced on 3 February, and the venues and kick-off times were announced on 23 March.

Pool stage

Pool A

Fixtures

Pool B

Fixtures

Finals

5th/6th place

3rd/4th place

1st/2nd place

Final classification

Statistics

Top points scorers

Top try scorers

References

External links
The official Six Nations Site

Women
2021
2021 rugby union tournaments for national teams
2020–21 in Irish rugby union
2020–21 in English rugby union
2020–21 in Welsh rugby union
2020–21 in Scottish rugby union
2020–21 in French rugby union
2020–21 in Italian rugby union
Six
rugby union
rugby union
rugby union
rugby union
rugby union
rugby union
Six Nations Championship (women)
Six Nations Championship (women)
Six Nations Championship (women)